In functional analysis and related areas of mathematics, quasibarrelled spaces are topological vector spaces (TVS) for which every bornivorous barrelled set in the space is a neighbourhood of the origin. 
Quasibarrelled spaces are studied because they are a weakening of the defining condition of barrelled spaces, for which a form of the Banach–Steinhaus theorem holds.

Definition

that is, if for each bounded subset  of  there exists some scalar  such that  
A barrelled set or a barrel in a TVS is a set which is convex, balanced, absorbing and closed.  
A quasibarrelled space is a TVS for which every bornivorous barrelled set in the space is a neighbourhood of the origin.

Properties

A locally convex Hausdorff quasibarrelled space that is sequentially complete is barrelled.  
A locally convex Hausdorff quasibarrelled space is a Mackey space, quasi-M-barrelled, and countably quasibarrelled.  
A locally convex quasibarrelled space that is also a σ-barrelled space is necessarily a barrelled space.  

A locally convex space is reflexive if and only if it is semireflexive and quasibarrelled.

Characterizations

A Hausdorff topological vector space  is quasibarrelled if and only if every bounded closed linear operator from  into a complete metrizable TVS is continuous.  
By definition, a linear  operator is called closed if its graph is a closed subset of  

For a locally convex space  with continuous dual  the following are equivalent:
  is quasibarrelled.
 Every -bounded subset of the continuous dual space  is equicontinuous.

If  is a metrizable locally convex TVS then the following are equivalent:

Examples and sufficient conditions

Every Hausdorff barrelled space and every Hausdorff bornological space is quasibarrelled.  
Thus, every metrizable TVS is quasibarrelled.  

Note that there exist quasibarrelled spaces that are neither barrelled nor bornological.  
There exist Mackey spaces that are not quasibarrelled.  
There exist distinguished spaces, DF-spaces, and -barrelled spaces that are not quasibarrelled.  

The strong dual space  of a Fréchet space  is distinguished if and only if  is quasibarrelled.

Counter-examples

There exists a DF-space that is not quasibarrelled.  
There exists a quasibarrelled DF-space that is not bornological.  
There exists a quasibarrelled space that is not a σ-barrelled space.

See also

References

Bibliography

  
  
  
  
  
  
  
  
  
  
  
  
  
  
  

Topological vector spaces